Teatro Carlo Goldoni or Teatro Goldoni can refer to a number of theaters or opera houses in Italy, dedicated to Carlo Goldoni:

Teatro Goldoni (Bagnacavallo), Province of Ravenna, Italy
Teatro Goldoni (Corinaldo), Province of  Ancona, Italy
Teatro Goldoni (Florence), Region of Tuscany, Italy
Teatro Goldoni (Livorno), Region of Tuscany, Italy
Teatro Goldoni (Venice), Region of Veneto, Italy